Machi Esports was a professional esports organization founded by Taiwanese hip hop group Machi. Machi previously had a League of Legends team competing in the League of Legends Master Series (LMS) and later the Pacific Championship Series (PCS), as well as an academy team competing in the Elite Challenger Series (ECS) named MachiX.

History 
Machi sold its spot in the LMS to Alpha Esports in late 2018.

It was announced on 18 February 2020 that Machi would be one of the ten franchise partners of the PCS, the successor to the LMS, after G-Rex forfeited its spot and disbanded.

Final roster

References

External links 
 

2014 establishments in Taiwan
Esports teams based in Taiwan
Esports teams established in 2014
Former League of Legends Master Series teams
Pacific Championship Series teams
Defunct and inactive Overwatch teams